Thiago Santos (born 1984) is a Brazilian mixed martial artist.

Thiago Santos may also refer to the following people:

Thiago Santos (fighter, born 1986), Brazilian mixed martial artist
Thiago Santos (footballer, born 1984), Brazilian football second striker
Thiago Santos (footballer, born 1987), Brazilian football forward for Nea Salamina	
Thiago Santos (footballer, born 1989), Brazilian football defensive midfielder for Grêmio
Thiago Santos (footballer, born 1990), Brazilian footballer for Brasil de Pelotas	
Thiago Santos (footballer, born 1992), Brazilian football midfielder for Bankhai United
Thiago Santos (footballer, born 1995), Brazilian football attacking midfielder for NEROCA

See also
Tiago Santos (born 2002), Portuguese football right-back for Estoril